Percival James "Perce" Wilson (February 22, 1890 – September 20, 1936), sometimes shown as Percy Wilson, was an American football player.  He was the quarterback for the 1920 Detroit Heralds during the first regular season of the National Football League (then known as the American Professional Football Association).  He was one of the first Canadian-born players, and the first Canadian-born quarterback, to play in the NFL.

Early years
Wilson was born in 1890 in Lifford, Ontario, Canada.  His father, James Wilson, was born in Canada to Irish immigrants. His mother, Anna, was also born in Canada.

Wilson moved to Detroit as a young boy and attended Detroit's Western High School. By 1917, Wilson had become a naturalized United States citizen and was employed in the milk and creamery business in Detroit.

Professional football
In 1920, he played for the Detroit Heralds during the first regular season of the National Football League (then known as the American Professional Football Association).  The Heralds opened their season with a game against the Cleveland Panthers, played at Navin Field on October 10, 1920. The Heralds won by a 40-14 score, and Wilson, the Heralds' starting quarterback, scored the team's fifth touchdown.  Two weeks later, Wilson appeared in the Heralds' game against the Columbus Panhandles as a substitute at the quarterback position.  On November 28, 1920, he played at the left halfback position for the Heralds.

Wilson was one of the first Canadian-born players, and the first Canadian-born quarterback, to play in the NFL.  The other three Canadian-born players to play in the NFL during its inaugural 1920 season were Buck MacDonald, a guard, Tommy Hughitt, a halfback, and Jim Bryant, a halfback.

Later years
Wilson and his brother, Ernie Wilson, also played basketball for the Detroit Rayls, a team that existed in the late 1910s and early 1920s.

Wilson died in 1936 at age 46.

References

1890 births
1936 deaths
American football quarterbacks
Detroit Heralds players
Players of American football from Detroit
Sportspeople from Kawartha Lakes
Sportspeople from Ontario
Western International High School alumni
Canadian emigrants to the United States
Canadian players of American football